The women's 4 × 110 yards relay at the 1962 British Empire and Commonwealth Games as part of the athletics programme was held at the Perry Lakes Stadium on Saturday 1 December 1962.

The event was won Australian team of Joyce Bennett, Glenys Beasley, Brenda Cox and Betty Cuthbert in a time of 46.6. They narrowly finished ahead of English team of Ann Packer, Dorothy Hyman, Daphne Arden and Betty Moore and the New Zealand quartet of Nola Bond, Molly Cowan, Doreen Porter and Avis McIntosh who won bronze. England was leading by five yards coming in the final baton change, however Moore started her run too early and had to stop almost dead before receiving the baton. This cost England dearly as Cuthbert caught Moore two yards from the finish.

Records

Final

References

Women's 4 x 110 yards relay
1962
Comm